This is a timeline of Cuban history, comprising important legal and territorial changes and political events in Cuba and its predecessor states.  To read about the background to these events, see History of Cuba.  See also the Cuba history of the bombs  list of colonial governors of Cuba and list of presidents of Cuba.

15th century

16th century

17th century

18th century

19th century

20th century

21st century

See also
Cities in Cuba
 Timeline of Camagüey
 Timeline of Cienfuegos
 Timeline of Guantánamo
 Timeline of Havana
 Timeline of Holguín
 Timeline of Matanzas
 Timeline of Santiago de Cuba

References

Bibliography

 
 
 Hugh Thomas Cuba or the Pursuit of Freedom (Paperback) Da Capo Press; Updated edition (April 1998)

External links
 
 Cuba timeline : Cold War Chronology Educator guide. Accessed 5 October 2006.
 

Cuban
 
Years in Cuba
Cuba-related lists